This is a list of the kings of the Anglo-Saxon Kingdom of Kent.

The regnal dates for the earlier kings are known only from Bede. Some kings are known mainly from charters, of which several are forgeries, while others have been subjected to tampering in order to reconcile them with the erroneous king lists of chroniclers, baffled by blanks, and confused by concurrent reigns and kings with similar or identical names.  It is commonplace for the later kings to be referred to as subkings, but the actual rank used is always rex, never regulus (except for a late legend concerning Eormenred). The usual style was simply King of Kent (rex Cantiae) or King of the Kentish Men (rex Cantuariorum). Territorial division within Kent is not alluded to, except by Eadberht I (rex Cantuariorum terram dimidii) and Sigered (rex dimidie partis prouincie Cantuariorum).

List of kings of Kent 

{| class="wikitable"
|- sdfghjkl/kl;sj|GB:LXCN kxsjklsi'hbkclnùųșαλΛαώξζڜໝ໕ຍ±±±±±±
!width="18%"|Reign
!width="15%"|Incumbent
!width="25%"|Style
!width="15%"|Notes
|- valign=top bgcolor="#ffffec"
|455-488
|Hengest
|no charters
|father of Oisc or Octa
|- valign=top bgcolor="#ffffec"
|455
|Horsa
|no charters
|brother of Hengest
|- valign=top bgcolor="#ffffec" 
|488-512/516||Oisc(Œsc, Æsc, Ash, Oeric)
|no charters
|son of Hengest or Octa
|- valign=top bgcolor="#ffffec"
|512/516-534/540||Octa(Octha)
|no charters
|son of Hengest
|- valign=top bgcolor="#ffffec"
|534/540-c.590
|Eormenric
|no charters
|father of Æðelberht I
|- valign=top bgcolor="#ffffec"
|c.590 - 24 February 616 (Bede)
|Æðelberht I
|no genuine charters
|first Christian King of Kent
|- valign=top bgcolor="#ffffec"
|February 616 to 20 January 640 (Bede)
|Eadbald
|no genuine charters
|son of Æðelberht I
|- valign=top bgcolor="#ffffec"
|unknown
|Æðelwald
|no charters
|contemporary with Pope Boniface V (619-625)
|- valign=top bgcolor="#ffffec"
|January 640 to 14 July 664 (Bede)
|Eorcenberht
|no charters
|son of Eadbald
|- valign=top bgcolor="#ffffec"
|unknown
|Eormenred
|Irminredus
|brother of Eorcenberht
|- valign=top bgcolor="#ffffec"
|July 664 to 4 July 673 (Bede)
|Ecgberht I
|no charters
|son of Eorcenberht
|- valign=top bgcolor="#ffffec"
|acceded 674 or 675,

died 685
|Hlothhere
|Lotharius rex Cantuariorum

Lotharius rex Cancie

Clotharius

Hlotharius
|son of Eorcenberht; reigning jointly with Eadric
|- valign=top bgcolor="#ffffec"
|685 to 686 (Bede)
|Eadric
|Eadricus rex Cantuariorum

Ædricus rex

Edricus
|son of Ecgberht I; reigning jointly with Hlothhere
|- valign=top bgcolor="#ffffec"
|killed 687
|Mul
|Mulo rege regnum Cantie
|brother of Cædwalla, King of Wessex
|- valign=top bgcolor="#ffffec"
|acceded 687 or 688,

still reigning 692
|Swæfheard
|Suebhardus rex Cantuariorum

Sueaberdus rex Cantie
|son of Sæbbi, King of Essex, reigning jointly in Kent with Oswine and Withred
|- valign=top bgcolor="#ffffec"
|fl. 689
|Swæfberht
|Gabertus

Suebertus rex Cantuariorum
|jointly with Oswine
|- valign=top bgcolor="#ffffec"
|fl. 689 to 690
|Oswine
|Oswynus rex Cantie

Oswinus rex Cantuariorum
|jointly with Swæfberht and Swæfheard 
|- valign=top bgcolor="#ffffec"
|acceded  c. 693, seven years after Edric's disposition (Malmesbury 1.15),

died 23 April 725
|Wihtred
|Wihtredus rex Cantie

Wythredus rex Cantuariorum

Wihtredus rex Cantuariorum
|son of Ecgberht I; reigned jointly with Swæfheard
|- valign=top bgcolor="#ffffec"
|succeeded 725
|Alric
|no charters
|son of Wihtred; succeeded jointly with his brothers Æðelberht II and Eadberht I
|- valign=top bgcolor="#ffffec"
|725 to 748
|Eadberht I
|Eadbertus rex Cantuariorum terram dimidii

Ædbeortus rex Cantie
|son of Wihtred; reigned jointly with his brothers Æðelberht II and Ælfric
|- valign=top
|colspan="4"|Subject to Mercian overlordship
|- valign=top bgcolor="#ffffec"
|725 to 762
|Æðelberht II
|Æthilberhctus rex Cantie
Athelbertus rex
|son of Wihtred; reigned jointly with his brothers Eadberht I and Ælfric, and nephew Eardwulf
|- valign=top bgcolor="#ffffec"
|unknown
|Eardwulf
|Earduulfus rex Cantuariorum

Eardulfus rex Cantiae
|son of Eadberht I; reigned jointly with Æðelberht II; contemporary with Archbishop Cuðbert (740-760)
|- valign=top bgcolor="#ffffec"
|fl. 762
|Eadberht II
|Eadberht rex Cantiae

Ædbertus rex

Eadbertus rex Cantie
|jointly with Sigered
|- valign=top bgcolor="#ffffec"
|fl. 762
|Sigered
|Sigiraed rex Cantiae

Sigeredus rex dimidie partis prouincie Cantuariorum
|jointly with Eadberht II
|- valign=top bgcolor="#ffffec"
|762-764
|Eanmund
|Eanmundus rex
|contemporary with Archbishop Bregowine (761-764)
|- valign=top bgcolor="#ffffec"
|fl. 764 to 765
|Heaberht
|Heaberhtus rex Cantie

Heaberhtus rex
|jointly with Ecgberht II
|- valign=top bgcolor="#ffffec"
|fl. 765 to 779
|Ecgberht II
|Ecgberhtus rex Cantie

Egcberhtus rex Cantiae

Egcberht rex Cantie

Egcberth rex Cantie

Egcberhtus rex
|jointly with Heaberht
|- valign=top bgcolor="#ffffec"
|fl. 784
|Ealhmund
|Ealmundus rex Canciæ
|father of Ecgberht III
|- valign=top
|colspan="4"|Under the direct rule of Offa of Mercia (785–796).
|- valign=top bgcolor="#ffffec"
|796 to 798, deposed
|Eadberht III Præn
|no charters; coins:

EADBEARHT REX
|Deposed and mutilated by Cœnwulf
|- valign=top bgcolor="#ffffec"
|acceded 797 or 798, 
died 807
|Cuðred
|Cuthredus Rex CantiaeCuðred rex CantiaeCuðredus rex cantwariorum|brother of Cœnwulf and Ceolwulf
|- valign=top bgcolor="#ffffec"
|fl. 809
|Cœnwulf
|Ceonulfus Christi gracia rex Merciorum atque provincie Cancie|brother of Cuðred and Ceolwulf; also King of Mercia (796-821)
|- valign=top bgcolor="#ffffec"
|fl. 822 to 823
|Ceolwulf
|Ceolwulf rex Merciorum vel etiam ContwariorumCeolwulf rex Merciorum seu etiam Cantwariorum|brother of Cuðred and Cœnwulf; also King of Mercia (821-823)
|- valign=top bgcolor="#ffffec"
|deposed in 825
|Baldred
|no charters; coins:

BALDRED REX CANT
|expelled by Æðelwulf in 825
|- valign=top bgcolor="#ffffec"
|825 to 839
|Ecgberht III
|Ecgberht rex occidentalium Saxonum necnon et Cantuariorum|son of Ealhmund; reigned in Kent jointly with his son Æðelwulf; also King of Wessex (802-839)
|- valign=top bgcolor="#ffffec"
|825 to 858
|Æðelwulf
|Aetheluulf rexÆðeluulf rex CantrariorumÆthelwolf gratia Dei rex KanciaeÆtheluulf rex CancieAeðeluulf Rex CancieAetheluulf gratia Dei rex occidentalium Saxonum seu etiam CantuuariorumAeðeluulf gratia Dei rex occidentalium Saxonum nec non 7 CantuariorumEðelwulf rex occidentalium Saxonum nec non et CantuariorumEðeluulfus rex Occidentalium Saxonum necnon et CantuariorumÆðelulf rex misericordia Dei occidentalium Saxonum; necnon & Cantuuariorum|jointly with his father Ecgberht III and son Æðelstan; also King of Wessex (839-856)
|- valign=top bgcolor="#ffffec"
|fl. 839 to 851
|Æðelstan I
|Edelstan rex KancieEthelstan RexAeðelstan rexAedelstan rex|jointly with his father Æðelwulf
|- valign=top bgcolor="#ffffec"
|fl. 855 to 866
|Æðelberht III
|Aeðelberht rexEþelbearht rexEðelbearht rexÆthelbertus occidentalium Saxonum necnon et Cantuariorum rexAeðelbearht rex Occidentalium Saxonum seu CantuuariorumAeðælberht rex Occidentalium Saxonum seu CantuariorumEðelbearht rex occidentalium Saxonum nec non et Cantuariorum|jointly with his father Æðelwulf; also King of Wessex (860-866)
|- valign=top bgcolor="#ffffec"
|866 to 871
|Æðelred I
|Eðelred rex occidentalium Saxonum . non et CantwariorumAeðered rex Occidentalium Saxonum necnon et Cantuariorum|son of Æðelwulf; also King of Wessex (866-871)
|}

See also
List of English monarchs
Kentish Royal Legend
Anglo-Saxon royal genealogies
On the Resting-Places of the Saints (list of Anglo-Saxon saints - Secgan)

Sources
Campbell, A. 1973. Charters of Rochester. Anglo-Saxon Charters 1.
Fryde, E. B., Greenway, D. E., Porter, S., & Roy, I. 1986. Handbook of British Chronology, 3rd ed. Royal Historical Society Guides and Handbooks 2.
Garmonsway, G. N. 1954. The Anglo-Saxon Chronicle, 2nd edition.
Kelly, S. E. 1995. Charters of St. Augustine's Abbey Canterbury and Minster-in-Thanet. Anglo-Saxon Charters 4.
King, J. E. 1930. Baedae Opera Historica. Loeb Classical Library 246 & 248.
Kirby, D. P. 1991. The Earliest English Kings.
Sawyer, P. H. 1968. Anglo-Saxon Charters: An Annotated List and Bibliography. Royal Historical Society Guides and Handbooks 8.
Searle, W. G. 1899. Anglo-Saxon Bishops, Kings and Nobles.Sweet, H. 1896. The Student’s Dictionary of Anglo-Saxon.
Yorke, B. 1990. Kings and Kingdoms of Early Anglo-Saxon England''.

 
Monarchs of Kent
 
Monarchs
Kent

eo:Kent (regno)